|}

The Fred Archer Stakes is a Listed flat horse race in Great Britain open to thoroughbreds aged four years or older. It is run on the July Course at Newmarket over a distance of 1 mile 4 furlongs (2,413 metres), and it is scheduled to take place each year in late June or early July.

Winners since 1988

See also 
 Horse racing in Great Britain
 List of British flat horse races

References
 Paris-Turf:

Racing Post:

Flat races in Great Britain
Newmarket Racecourse
Open middle distance horse races